Hazinia is a genus of harvestmen in the family Nemastomatidae with 2 described species from the Balkans.

Species
There are currently 2 described species in the genus Hadzinia:

Hadzinia ferrani Novak & Kozel, 2014  Ferranova buža cave, Vrhnika, Slovenia
Hadzinia karamani (Hadži, 1940)  Bosnia & Herzegovina and Croatia

References

Harvestman genera
Arachnids of Europe